The Space Launch Complex 46 (SLC-46), previously Launch Complex 46 (LC-46), is a launch complex at Cape Canaveral Space Force Station operated under license by Space Florida previously used for Athena rocket launches.

History

Construction and Trident Operations 
This complex was built as part of the U.S. Navy's Trident II submarine-launch missile development effort. Construction was underway by early February 1984, with the first Trident II launch LC-46 occurring on 15 January 1987. A total of 19 Trident IIs were launched from the site between 15 January 1987 and 27 January 1989. After this, all subsequent Trident II testing took place at sea, and the site was deactivated.

During the construction of then-called LC-46, the nearby sounding rocket complex LC-43 was demolished. Its operations were transferred to LC-47.

Space Florida
In 1997, Space Florida began operations at the site, and was opened for commercial space operations. Lockheed Martin launched an Athena II and an Athena I from the pad in 1998 and 1999 respectively. The Athena II, launched January 7, 1998, carried the Lunar Prospector spacecraft which orbited the Moon. On January 27, 1999, the Athena I lifted off with Taiwan's first satellite, ROCSAT-1, carrying experimental communications, ocean imagery, and ionospheric studies instruments.

In March 2010, the USAF 45th Space Wing issued Real Property Licenses to Space Florida for Launch Complexes 36 and 46 at Cape Canaveral Air Force Station. On July 1, 2010, the Federal Aviation Administration approved a Launch Site Operator's License for commercial launches at Launch Complex 46.

On September 24, 2010, the Economic Development Commission of Florida's Space Coast was awarded a $500,000 Defense Infrastructure Grant from the State of Florida to be used for critical communications upgrades at SLC-46. In early 2014, Space Florida contracted with Alliant Techsystems (ATK) to begin phase three of the communications infrastructure refurbishment, with completion expected to take one year.

In July 2015, the U.S. Air Force and Orbital ATK announced a Minotaur IV launched from SLC-46 would be used for the ORS-5 mission in 2017. ORS-5 was successfully launched on August 26, 2017.

Ascent Abort-2 

On July 2, 2019, NASA launched a repurposed Peacekeeper missile from SLC-46, carrying the Orion spacecraft for the Ascent Abort-2 mission. The mission's goal was to demonstrate and qualify the Orion Launch Abort System (LAS) that will allow the astronaut crew to safely escape in the event of an emergency during launch pad operations, through the ascent phase of the Orion vehicle.

Astra 
On December 6, 2021, Astra announced plans to launch its small orbital rockets from SLC-46 as soon as February 2022. The company was planning for a launch cadence of once a month for two years.

On 10 February 2022, the first Astra launch from SLC-46 resulted in failure. After two previous scrubbed launch attempts in the preceding days, the launch of the rocket occurred nominally. However, first stage separation failed, leading to the second stage to spin out of control, and the rocket and payload were lost.

On 12 June 2022, the second Astra launch from SLC-46 also resulted in failure. Astra's Rocket 3.3 vehicle (serial number LV0010) carrying two TROPICS CubeSats for NASA failed to reach orbit and the satellites were lost.

See also
 List of Cape Canaveral and Merritt Island launch sites

References

External links
 History of Launch Complex 46

Cape Canaveral Space Force Station
Launch complexes of the United States Space Force
Rocket launch sites in the United States
1987 establishments in Florida